Valoti is a surname. Notable people with the surname include:

Gianluca Valoti (born 1973), Italian racing cyclist
Mattia Valoti (born 1993), Italian footballer 
Paolo Valoti (born 1971), Italian racing cyclist